Hendrik Dreekmann (born 29 January 1975) is a former tennis player from Germany, who turned professional in 1991. He reached the quarterfinals of the 1994 French Open and the 1997 Miami Masters.

Personal life
Dreekmann was born in Bielefeld, West Germany, on 29 January 1975. He has been married to former long jumper Susen Tiedtke since 28 January 2005.

Career

Juniors
As a junior, Dreekmann was the runner-up at the 1989 European Junior Championships in Sofia, and reached the semis at the 1991 Orange Bowl.

Pro tour
Dreekman's greatest result in singles was reaching the quarterfinals of the 1994 French Open, only the second grand slam he had participated in. En route he defeated Adrian Voinea, Richey Reneberg and former top tenners Carlos Costa and Aaron Krickstein. In the quarter-finals, Dreekman led Magnus Larsson two sets to love, but eventually lost in five sets.

The right-hander reached his highest individual ranking on the ATP Tour on 30 September 1996, when he became World No. 39.

ATP career finals

Singles: 2 (2 runner-ups)

Doubles: 1 (1 runner-up)

ATP Challenger and ITF Futures finals

Singles: 6 (3–3)

Doubles: 2 (1–1)

Performance timeline

Singles

External links
 
 
 

1975 births
Living people
German male tennis players
Sportspeople from Bielefeld
Tennis people from North Rhine-Westphalia